A ringleader is a leader of a group of people.

Ringleader may also refer to:
 Ringmaster (circus),  The leader of a circus performance. 
 Ringleader (comics), a fictional character in the Marvel Universe
 Ringleader of the Tormentors, an album by the singer Morrissey
 The Ringleader: Mixtape Volume III, an album by the disc jockey DJ Maj
 A gang leader

See also
 Ringmaster (disambiguation)